Treasure Hunt is a UK game show, based on the format of the French show La Chasse au Trésor, created by Jacques Antoine. It appeared on Channel 4 between 28 December 1982 and 18 May 1989 and was revived by BBC Two between 16 December 2002 and 2 August 2003.

The game
A team of two contestants in the studio had to use a library of maps and reference materials to solve up to five clues, and communicate instructions via a radio link to a skyrunner who had the use of a helicopter. Although viewers could see the skyrunner, the contestants could not, and all communication between them was by sound only. The contestants were given the first clue for free, the solving of which would lead to the location of the second clue and so on until a trinket or other significant object was found by solving the final clue.

The contestants won a higher cash prize each time they solved a clue correctly. This was all done against the clock. Even once the contestants had solved the final clue, the skyrunner still had to confirm they were correct, by reaching the final target. On a few occasions, the contestants solved all five clues with time to spare, in which case, a bonus clue was given to the contestants. This typically resulted in their winning a bottle of champagne.

The skyrunner and helicopter did not have freedom to fly and land anywhere they wished. Although the pilot could to an extent request permission from airspace authorities to fly off-course, as happened on occasions, landings needed to be agreed in advance with landowners of a suitable location near the clue.  On occasions the helicopter would land in a clearly marked out area, especially at public places. Kenneth Kendall always stressed that he did not know the clues and locations in advance, and any help that he gave the contestants was from his own knowledge.

According to a "making of Treasure Hunt" programme, Anneka Rice was confined to the hotel on the day that the camera operator, video and sound recordist; and helicopter pilot undertook a rehearsal (typically the day before the programme was recorded), so she had no advance knowledge of the locations. This did not stop her carrying out research about the general area in order to have a stock of facts to fill in any silences that might arise while the contestants were thinking.

Presenters and crew

In the original version, the presenter was former BBC newsreader Kenneth Kendall and the "skyrunner" was broadcaster Anneka Rice. In the first series, Kendall was joined briefly in the studio for the handover of the first clue by the original clue-setter, Ann Meo. She would later rejoin the contestants if they had been successful in finding the treasure to offer her congratulations. If they had been unsuccessful, she would be heard as a voiceover explaining where they had gone wrong.

From the second series onwards, this role was expanded, another studio-based person acted as adjudicator, giving the contestants tips on how they were doing against the scheduled time, and providing additional information about the locations visited. In series 2, this was Annette Lynton ("Nettie") and from series 3 onwards, TV-am weather girl Wincey Willis.

In 1988, Rice left to have a baby, and her place was taken by tennis player Annabel Croft. In this series, the set was revamped due to a move to Thames Television's facilities (the original studios were at Trilion in Soho, London, and then Limehouse Studios on Canary Wharf in Docklands, East London which was later earmarked for demolition to make way for One Canada Square), and Willis was promoted to sharing main billing with Kendall. Croft was billed as "Guest Skyrunner" for the first episode of the series, and it was stated at the time that Rice would return after giving birth, but it turned out to be the show's final series and the "Guest Skyrunner" credit was dropped.

In the BBC's 2002–2003 version, newsreader Dermot Murnaghan presented, the "skyrunner" was Suzi Perry, and there was no adjudicator. Advances in broadcasting technology meant that this new version could come from a much greater range of locations; however, the new version was short-lived.

Keith Thompson of Castle Air Charters was the usual helicopter pilot in both versions, though for overseas editions a local pilot was often used. There was always a "chase" helicopter which relayed radio signals back to London and, although this could never be used tactically by the contestants, it was not hidden from the viewers. This communications helicopter had dark green with gold stripe livery, registration G-SPEY. The two crews would sometimes fly in formation to generate exciting footage. During one episode, G-SPEY was utilised to film pictures instead of Graham in G-BHXU; Thompson was required to land on a submarine in Plymouth Sound, and footage from a second cameraman in G-SPEY was used to show his landing.

Both helicopters were usually Bell 206 JetRangers; the helicopter usually used by the skyrunner was registration G-BHXU (which crash landed at sea in 1995 due to engine/gearbox failure).

A feature was made of the camaraderie between the female presenter and the male recording and flight crews. Shots from the rear as the presenter ran from clue to clue in a jump-suit were satirised on Spitting Image.

In 1985, the cameraman, Graham Berry, was awarded a BAFTA for his contribution to the series.

The contestants would win a cash prize of £1,000 (£2,000 in the revived version).

Broadcasts
When first shown on Channel 4 on 28 December 1982, Treasure Hunt was one of the earliest major series on the then-new channel. The unusual format earned extra publicity for both the programme and the channel, which was striving to justify itself with new and different programming.

The 1982–1989 series were repeated on terrestrial television several times, and during the 1990s appeared on the Challenge satellite and cable channel, as well as Sky Travel. The first episode was repeated on 30 October 2007 on the digital channel More4 as part of Channel 4's 25th anniversary celebrations. This was a one-off and there are no current plans to repeat the TV show.

On 21 November 2013, Challenge announced that they re-acquired the first two series. The first episode was repeated again on 28 December 2013 as part of Challenge's First Ever Episodes weekend. Challenge confirmed that the re-run of series 1 and 2 would air on Saturdays and Sundays from 8 February 2014. The Saturday episode was screened at 6pm and the Sunday episode aired at 5pm (times varied afterwards).

The original run of the first series was watched by up to 900,000 viewers; however, by the mid-1980s, ratings were some of the highest for Channel 4 at around seven million.

Two charity editions of the show were produced, one locally in the London area for the Thames Television telethon in 1985 and another broadcast across the UK as part of the ITV network's Telethon '88. The show was also featured in an edition of the BBC children's aspiration show Jim'll Fix It, in which a young viewer joined Anneka Rice in the famous helicopter over the county of Surrey for a scaled down version of the show, in The Paul Daniels Magic Show (BBC) and in The Krypton Factor (Granada for ITV).

For all the UK series, the programme was a Chatsworth Television independent production in association with Tele Union Paris.

Spin-offs
An eponymous board game based on the show was published in the UK. It involved moving pieces around a map of England and Wales.

There was also a computer game released for some home computer formats in 1986, including for the BBC Micro, published by Macsen Software. This game featured very basic graphic layout and was text-driven, and had the options of four locations to find clues in.

A one-off Welsh language version,  (Welsh for "Treasure Hunt"), was produced for S4C in 1985.

BBC Three Counties Radio aired Treasure Quest each Sunday from 9am to 12 noon. Andy Gelder was in the studio and varying assistants in the radio car help two contestants to solve clues over the three-hour period. This format has now changed to Saturday mornings and now hosted by Jonathan Vernon-Smith, sharing with BBC Radio Northampton, with two runners running simultaneously in the two radio areas during the same programme. It currently airs from 10am to 12pm.

BBC Radio Norfolk began their own version of Treasure Quest in 2008, on Sunday mornings from 9am to 12 noon. David Whiteley presents in the studio, with Sophie Little in the radio car. On 6 September 2009, Wincey Willis stood in for the then clue hunter Becky Betts, and on 14 February 2010, Anneka Rice took part in the programme, appearing at the fifth clue location, Norwich Castle, and then teaming up with Betts to find the treasure.

On London's talk station LBC, presenter James O'Brien hosted The Treasure Hunt on Wednesday lunchtimes as part of his weekday show. In this format, callers rang in and requested things they had been trying to get hold of, hoping that other listeners had the required items. Although otherwise unrelated to the original concept, the programme opened with the Treasure Hunt television series theme tune, and in August 2007, Anneka Rice recorded a voice-over lead-in for it.

BBC Radio Shropshire present their own version of Treasure Hunt on Sunday mornings with presenter Ryan Kennedy reading out a set of clues to various locations. Prior to the first COVID-19 lockdown, the answers gave directions with a colleague driving to that location in the county. Currently the quiz operates as a virtual tour with the answers providing locations both in the county and worldwide.

Cambridge 105 Radio have also presented their own version called 'Where's Flossie Live!'. Flossie is name of the station's outside broadcast vehicle. This would air on a bank holiday weekend. Clues would be set around the city of Cambridge and a presenter, usually on a bike, accompanied by a sound/broadcast engineer would have to solve each clue at a different location to be able to move on to the next location. Flossie would be located at the final destination. The starting point was typically the station's studios on the Gwydir Street Enterprise Centre in Cambridge.

Transmissions

Original

Specials

Revival

List of episodes

1982–1989 version

2002–2003 version

References

External links
Anneka Rice
Episode guide — with exhaustive location, clue and crew listings plus helicopter registration letters

"Off The Telly" article

1982 British television series debuts
2003 British television series endings
Aviation television series
BBC television game shows
1980s British game shows
2000s British game shows
Channel 4 game shows
English-language television shows
British television series revived after cancellation